Downtown Battle Mountain is the debut studio album by American post-hardcore band Dance Gavin Dance, released on May 15, 2007, on Rise Records. The album serves as a follow-up to the band's debut extended play, Whatever I Say Is Royal Ocean, which was released in 2006. The title of the album was inspired by the unincorporated town Battle Mountain, Nevada after the band visited the city. The album was produced by Kris Crummett, who would go on to produce most of the band's future studio releases.

The album was supported by four singles; "And I Told Them I Invented Times New Roman", "Lemon Meringue Tie", "The Backwards Pumpkin Song", and "Open Your Eyes and Look North". It is the band's first of two studio albums to feature clean vocalist Jonny Craig. Craig left in late 2007, later re-joining in mid-2010. It is also the band's only full-length to feature guitarist Sean O'Sullivan, who left the band in late 2007. A non-direct sequel to the album, titled Downtown Battle Mountain II, was released on March 8, 2011.

Track listing

Personnel
Dance Gavin Dance
Jonny Craig – clean vocals
Jon Mess – unclean vocals
Will Swan – guitar
Sean O'Sullivan – guitar
Eric Lodge – bass guitar
Matt Mingus – drums, percussion

Additional personnel
 Kris Crummett – production, engineering, mixing, mastering
 Mattias Adolfsson – artwork

Charts

References

2007 debut albums
Dance Gavin Dance albums
Rise Records albums
Albums produced by Kris Crummett